1T may refer to:
One-T, a French electronic musical project
1T-SRAM, a type of pseudostatic random-access memory
1T DRAM, a type of Dynamic random-access memory
SSH 1T, alternate designation for Washington State Route 501
1T-TaS2, the only transition-metal dichalcogenide known to develop the Mott phase
1T, a model of Chevrolet Chevette
1-T, a synthetic anabolic–androgenic steroid

See also
Trillion (disambiguation)
T1 (disambiguation)